The 2004 Sam Houston State Bearkats football team represented Sam Houston State University as a member of the Southland Conference during the 2004 NCAA Division I-AA football season. Sam Houston State advanced to the Division I-AA playoffs and defeated Western Kentucky and  before losing to Montana in the semifinal.

Schedule

References

Sam Houston
Sam Houston Bearkats football seasons
Southland Conference football champion seasons
Sam Houston State Bearkats football